New Zealand is competing at the 2013 World Championships in Athletics in Moscow, Russia, from 10–18 August 2013.
A team of 9 athletes was announced to represent the country in the event.

Results
(q – qualified, NM – no mark, SB – season best)

Men
Track and road events

Field events

Decathlon

Women
Track and road events

Field events

See also
New Zealand at other World Championships in 2013
 New Zealand at the 2013 UCI Road World Championships
 New Zealand at the 2013 World Aquatics Championships

References

External links
IAAF World Championships – New Zealand

Nations at the 2013 World Championships in Athletics
World Championships in Athletics
New Zealand at the World Championships in Athletics